The 2022 Canadian Open championships (branded as the 2022 National Bank Open presented by Rogers for sponsorship reasons) were outdoor hard court tennis tournaments played from August 8 to August 14, 2022, as part of the 2022 US Open Series. The men's tournament took place at the IGA Stadium in Montreal and the women's event took place at the Sobeys Stadium in Toronto. It was the 132nd edition of the men's tournament—a Masters 1000 event on the 2022 ATP Tour, and the 120th edition of the women's tournament—a WTA 1000 event on the 2022 WTA Tour.

Points and prize money

Point distribution

Prize money

*per team

Champions

Men's singles

  Pablo Carreño Busta def.  Hubert Hurkacz, 3–6, 6–3, 6–3

Women's singles

  Simona Halep def.  Beatriz Haddad Maia 6–3, 2–6, 6–3

This was Halep's second title of the year and 24th of her career.

Men's doubles

  Wesley Koolhof /  Neal Skupski def.  Dan Evans /  John Peers, 6–2, 4–6, [10–6]

Women's doubles

  Coco Gauff /  Jessica Pegula def.  Nicole Melichar-Martinez /  Ellen Perez, 6–4, 6–7(5–7), [10–5].

By winning the title, Gauff gained the No. 1 WTA doubles ranking for the first time.

References

External links

2022 ATP Tour
2022 in Canadian tennis
2022 in Quebec
2022 in Toronto
August 2022 sports events in Canada
2022